Spermine is a polyamine involved in cellular metabolism that is found in all eukaryotic cells.  The precursor for synthesis of spermine is the amino acid ornithine. It is an essential growth factor in some bacteria as well. It is found as a polycation at physiological pH. Spermine is associated with nucleic acids and is thought to stabilize helical structure, particularly in viruses.

Antonie van Leeuwenhoek first described crystals of spermine phosphate in human semen in 1678. The name spermin was first used by the German chemists Ladenburg and Abel in 1888, and the correct structure of spermine was not finally established until 1926, simultaneously in England (by Dudley, Rosenheim, and Starling) and Germany (by Wrede et al.).  Spermine is the chemical primarily responsible for the characteristic odor of semen.

Derivative
A derivative of spermine, N1, N12-bis(ethyl)spermine (also known as BESm) was investigated in the late 1980s along with similar polyamine analogues for its potential as a cancer therapy.

Biosynthesis
Spermine biosynthesis in animals starts with decarboxylation of ornithine by the enzyme Ornithine decarboxylase in the presence of PLP. This decarboxylation gives putrescine. Thereafter the enzyme spermidine synthase effects two N-alkylation by decarboxy-S-Adenosyl methionine. The intermediate is spermidine.

Plants employ additional routes to spermine. In one pathway L-glutamine is the precursor to L-ornithine, after which the synthesis of spermine from L-ornithine follows the same pathway as in animals.

Another pathway in plants starts with decarboxylation of L-arginine to produce agmatine. The imine functional group in agmatine then is hydrolysed by agmatine deiminase, releasing ammonia, converting the guanidine group into a urea. The resulting N-carbamoylputrescine is acted on by a hydrolase to split off the urea group, leaving putrescine. After that the putrescine follows the same pathway to completing the synthesis of spermine.

References

Further reading
 Slocum, R. D., Flores, H. E., "Biochemistry and Physiology of Polyamines in Plants", CRC Press, 1991, USA, 
 Uriel Bachrach, "The Physiology of Polyamines", CRC Press, 1989, USA, 

NMDA receptor agonists
Secondary amines
Polyamines